The Nashville Banner is a defunct daily newspaper of Nashville, Tennessee, United States, which published from April 10, 1876 until February 20, 1998. The Banner was published each Monday through Friday afternoon (as well as Saturdays until the 1990s and Sundays until 1937), and at one time carried as many as five editions.

It was long a voice of conservative viewpoints in contrast to its liberal morning counterpart, The Tennessean, although these views were greatly moderated in the paper's twilight years.

History

The first edition of the Nashville Banner was published on April 10, 1876. It was begun as a voice for the railroads and other interests in comparison with other area papers of the time which tended to take the viewpoint of workers and unions. It was long controlled by the Stahlman family.

The Banner was an evening paper, which at one time published as many as five editions (first, second, market final, sports final, and sunset final), although these were later consolidated into three editions, and eventually, two. For many years it was in a superior financial condition to its competitors, and in fact, when the rival Tennessean went bankrupt and almost had to cease publication, the Banner assisted in its purchase by the Evans family, who saved it. The Tennessean and the Banner entered into what was one of the first joint operating agreements in the U.S. in 1937. Under this agreement, which became a common model for many other cities over the next half-century, the papers maintained editorial independence and remained separate as news-gathering organizations. However, they were printed on the same presses, distributed by a common agent, and had a consolidated classified advertising department. They were fierce competitors in the realm of news and ideas, but no longer business competitors in the truest sense.

This arrangement stood both papers in good stead for many years. However, the Banner began to suffer in the post-World War II era from the slow loss of readership that became common to most U.S. evening papers, which was largely attributed to the rise of television.

Though the two papers shared many vital resources, they were vastly different in their editorial agendas. One memorable instance of such differences occurred during the mid-1960s as the merits of Daylight Saving Time were being debated. The Tennessean/Banner offices, at the time, featured a dual-sided clock on the roof. One side had the Tennessean logo, the other had the Banners. Silliman Evans, Jr., owner of the Tennessean, supported DST and set its clock accordingly during the summer hours, but the Stahlman family, who controlled the Banner, opted to keep their side of the clock on standard time, causing confusion for the many drivers and pedestrians on busy Broadway.

Ed Huddleston wrote for The Banner including coverage of the Civil War in Middle Tennessee in 1965 for the centennial of the war’s end and the fight to save the historic Bijou Theatre, demolished as part of an urban renewal plan and replaced by the Municipal Auditorium.

In the early 1970s the Stahlmans sold the Banner to the Gannett Co. Gannett published it for several years, but in 1979 announced that it was assuming publication of the Tennessean while selling the Banner back to local owners Irby C. Simpkins, Jr., Brownlee O. Currey, and John Jay Hooker (Hooker later sold his stake in the paper to Simpkins and Currey).

[[File:Tennessean office.jpg|thumb|right|200px|The Banner shared these offices at 1100 Broadway with The Tennessean. The Banner'''s masthead design occupied the location of the Gannett logo in this photograph, but was removed shortly after the paper ceased publishing.]]Although it took almost twenty years, this was the death knell for the Banner. It was now clearly inferior in resources to its morning counterpart, and its circulation continued to shrink. In the 1980s Gannett insisted on renegotiation of the joint operating agreement to its benefit, and the Banner had little choice but to comply. Another reason for the weakness of the Banner was its lack of a Sunday edition comparable to the Tennessean's, which it had given up in the formation of the joint operating agreement. It had since always published on a six-day schedule, and as weekday papers, especially evening weekday papers, continued to decline, it did not have this profit center to draw upon. The Banner switched its Saturday edition for a while to a single, morning edition in direct competition with the Tennessean, then announced that it was terminating its Saturday edition entirely.

During this time, the Banner began to take far more moderate positions on issues on its editorial pages, although it generally remained more conservative than the Tennessean in most areas. It was in the contradictory situation of probably becoming more respected by people, especially those in the journalism community, at the same time that it was becoming less read.

The Banner adopted several new technologies soon before its demise, including early online efforts such as the launch of a daily e-mail newsletter ("Nashville Banner Digest") in 1996, as usage of e-mail and the World Wide Web was becoming more common. It also built and maintained a website nearly a year before The Tennessean, although only five months before the Banner went out of business. The Banner newsroom also became one of the nation's first to convert to the exclusive use of digital photography, completing the conversion just a few months before it ceased publication.

Closing
The end occurred when the Gannett Co. made the publishers of the Banner a large offer to terminate the joint operating agreement. The offer was approximately $65 million, likely more than any profit that could have been made by the continued publication of the Banner, so it ceased to exist. (This was not considered by the Justice Department to be an antitrust violation, but when Gannett attempted to do the same thing with its Honolulu Advertiser and the evening paper in that joint operating agreement, the Honolulu Star-Bulletin, only a few months later, it was prosecuted as such, the merger was forestalled, and both papers continued to operate until 2010.)

The Banner's final edition was published on Friday, February 20, 1998. The announcement to close was made public the previous Monday, February 16. Several of the Banner's popular features and reporters, including columnists Mary Hance ("Ms. Cheap") and Joe Biddle (sports), immediately went to The Tennessean.

Archives
The archives of the Nashville Banner were donated to the Nashville Public Library. The collection features the entire archive, a vending machine with the final edition still displayed in the window, the many awards the paper won over the years, various trinkets from the paper's offices, and a bronze statue of a paperboy selling the Banner which was originally placed on the plaza in front of the Tennessean/Banner offices. The archive is located at the downtown Nashville Public Library on Church Street and is open to the public.

Circulation history

Source: Audit Bureau of Circulations reports on Nashville Banner, March 1997 and June 1998.

Notable contributors
 Ralph McGill (sports editor)
 Roy Neel (lobbyist)
 Fred Russell (sports editor)
 Christine Sadler (journalist)
 Buster Olney (ESPN.com senior writer)
 Lamar Alexander (Vanderbilt campus correspondent)

See also
List of defunct newspapers of the United StatesThe TennesseanThe City PaperReferences

External links
 [http://www.nashvillepost.com/news/2008/2/15/nashville_now_and_then_ibanneri_days_gone_by February 2008 reminiscences on the 10th anniversary of the Banners closing], including personal essays from a former "Betty Banner" society reporter and a second-generation Banner journalist
 Archive of Nashville Banners website with final story, published February 20, 1998
An essay with images from the Nashville Banner Collection: John Egerton, "Walking into History: The Beginning of School Desegregation in Nashville," Southern Spaces'', 4 May 2009.

Defunct newspapers published in Tennessee
Mass media in Nashville, Tennessee
Publications established in 1876
Publications disestablished in 1998
1876 establishments in Tennessee
1998 disestablishments in Tennessee